Barbara Enright is an American professional poker player, motivational speaker, and editor-in-chief of Woman Poker Player magazine, and an Ambassador of Poker League of Nations, the world's largest women's poker organization. She has won three bracelets at the World Series of Poker and has made it to the US$10,000 No-Limit Hold'em Main Event final table.

Enright was the first woman to win an open event at the World Series of Poker and the first woman to win three WSOP bracelets, and is the only female player (as of 2019) to have made it to the final table of the $10,000 buy-in main event.

Early life 
Enright began playing poker at home at the age of 4, playing five card draw against her older brother. She started playing in cardrooms in 1976. Enright worked as a hairstylist, bartender, and cocktail waitress, often holding down three jobs at once to support her family. Soon she was making more money playing poker part-time than all of her jobs combined so she quit working and started playing poker for a living full-time.

Poker career 

Enright is best known as the only woman to have reached the final table of the World Series of Poker (WSOP) US$10,000 no limit hold'em Main Event. She achieved this in 1995, finishing in 5th place after her pocket eights were outdrawn by a suited 6-3. She also finished in the money in the 2005 Main Event, having qualified through a $10 online satellite tournament. Enright was the first woman to win two WSOP bracelets, the first woman to win three bracelets and the first woman to win an open event at the World Series of Poker.

On July 6, 2007, Barbara Enright was inducted into the Poker Hall of Fame along with Phil Hellmuth. She was the first woman to be inducted, followed only by Linda Johnson in 2011 and Jennifer Harman in 2015.  In 2008, Enright was inducted into the Women in Poker Hall of Fame, making her the only poker player to be in all three poker halls of fame including the Senior Poker Hall of Fame, the World Series of Poker Hall of Fame and the Women in Poker Hall of Fame.

Enright received the All Around Best Player Award at the 2000 Legends of Poker tournament and was awarded along with her prize money, a new PT Cruiser for her trophy. She had eight money finishes and six final tables.

She was the highest finisher among women in the Tournament of Champions of Poker held at the Orleans Hotel and Casino in Las Vegas. She finished in 11th place and just missed winning a car by one player.

She also took part in the televised poker series Poker Royale: Battle of the Ages.

As of 2018, Enright's total live tournament winnings exceed $1,650,000. Her 21 cashes at the WSOP account for over $425,000 of those winnings.

Enright is in a relationship with poker player and author Max Shapiro.

World Series Of Poker Bracelets 

* First woman to win a bracelet in an open event

Notes

External links 

 Woman Poker Player magazine

American poker players
Female poker players
Living people
World Series of Poker bracelet winners
Super Bowl of Poker event winners
People from Los Angeles
Year of birth missing (living people)
Poker Hall of Fame inductees